Viatcheslav Vladimirovich Ekimov (Russian Вячеслав Владимирович Екимов; born 4 February 1966), nicknamed Eki, is a Russian former professional racing cyclist.  A triple Olympic gold medalist, he was awarded the title of Russian Cyclist of the Century in 2001.

Biography
Ekimov was born in Vyborg, and started training as a cyclist at age 12 with a bicycle school affiliated with the famous centre of Aleksandr Kuznetsov. He trained in Leningrad at Lokomotiv and later Armed Forces sports society during the Soviet era.

Ekimov won three Olympic gold medals: in the track team pursuit in Seoul (1988) for the USSR, and in an upset, in the road time trial in Sydney (2000) for Russia. At the 2004 Summer Olympics in Athens, Ekimov won the silver medal for Russia in the men's road individual time trial, losing to American Tyler Hamilton. Hamilton was later admitted to doping and Ekimov was promoted to gold.

Ekimov joined the USPS team in 1997 as its first key international signing, briefly retiring in 2001 before rejoining the team the following year.  In the 2003 Tour de France Ekimov placed 10th in the prologue. He was a key force in the winning team time trial effort in stage four and was important to Lance Armstrong's fifth Tour victory both on the flats and in the mountains.  He missed the 2005 Tour de France due to injuries received in a training ride with Armstrong in Texas. During the final stage of the 2006 Tour de France, now racing for the Discovery Channel Pro Cycling Team, he announced that the 2006 Tour would be his last. He was honored by the peloton on the final stage, who allowed him to lead them over the line on the first of the eight laps of the Champs-Élysées.  Ekimov started and finished 15 Tours de France, tying him with Lucien Van Impe for the second most Tour finishes, behind Joop Zoetemelk and Sylvain Chavanel.

In September 2006 he finished riding for Discovery, but stayed with the team as Assistant Directeur Sportif to Johan Bruyneel. He helped guide the Discovery riders during the U.S. Pro Cycling Championships in 2006 as well as the Tour of California and the Tour de Georgia.

On 9 September 2009, it was announced he would join  as Directeur Sportif.

In October 2012, he was announced as the general manager of the Russian . The UCI, in a letter written to Katusha Team, denied them entrance into the 2013 World Tour. Among the many ethical violations the UCI cited, the appointment of Ekimov was among them for reasons unspecified. After the end of 2016 season Ekimov stepped down from the role.

Major results

1988
 1st  Team pursuit, Olympic Games 
 1st  Overall Regio-Tour
 1st  Overall Vuelta al Táchira
1st Prologue (ITT) & Stages 7 & 8 (ITT)
 1st  Overall Tour de Normandie
 2nd Overall Circuit Cycliste Sarthe
1st Stage 1 (ITT)
1989
 1st  Overall Circuit Franco-Belge
1st Stage 5b
 1st Stage 1 Tour de Trump
 2nd Overall Tour of Sweden
 2nd Overall Circuit Cycliste Sarthe
 3rd Overall Tour de Normandie
 3rd Overall Vuelta al Táchira
1st Prologue (ITT) & Stage 1
1990
 1st  Individual pursuit, UCI Track World Championships
 1st Stage 4 (TTT) Tour de France
 1st Stage 3 (ITT) Critérium International
 1st Stage 5 Vuelta Asturias
 1st Stage 5 Tour du Vaucluse
 3rd Overall Tour Méditerranéen
1st Stage 5 (ITT)
 4th Overall Tour of Ireland
 5th Overall Tour de Trump
 9th Overall Tour de l'Avenir
1991
 1st  Points race, UCI Track World Championships
 1st Stage 20 Tour de France
 1st Stage 3 (ITT) Critérium International
 4th Overall Vuelta a Murcia
 5th Overall Tour Méditerranéen
 7th Overall Four Days of Dunkirk
 9th Overall Tour of Ireland
 9th Overall Three Days of De Panne
 9th Milano–Torino
 9th Rund um den Henninger Turm
 10th Overall Euskal Bizikleta
1992
 1st Züri-Metzgete
 1st Druivenkoers-Overijse
 1st Stage 4 (TTT) Tour de France
 1st Stage 4 Setmana Catalana de Ciclisme
 2nd Overall Three Days of De Panne
 3rd Overall Four Days of Dunkirk
1st Stage 5
 3rd Overall GP du Midi Libre
1st Stage 6 (ITT)
 3rd Grand Prix des Nations
 3rd Trofeo Melinda
 3rd GP Rik Van Steenbergen
 3rd Baden–Baden
 4th La Flèche Wallonne
 4th Overall Vuelta a Andalucía
 6th Overall Tour Méditerranéen
 6th GP du canton d'Argovie
 6th Rund um den Henninger Turm
 9th Giro di Campania
1993
 1st Clásica de Almería
 1st Stage 5 Tour de Suisse
 1st Stage 5 Vuelta Asturias
 2nd Overall Four Days of Dunkirk
1st Stage 2
 2nd Grand Prix Impanis-Van Petegem
 3rd Road race, National Road Championships
 5th Overall Ronde van Nederland
 5th Japan Cup Cycle Road Race
 5th Rund um den Henninger Turm
 6th Overall Three Days of De Panne
 8th Liège–Bastogne–Liège
 9th Overall Vuelta a Murcia
1st Stage 2
 9th GP de Fourmies
 10th Giro di Lombardia
1994
 1st  Overall Volta a la Comunitat Valenciana
1st Stage 2
 1st  Overall Tour DuPont
1st Stages 5 (ITT) & 11 (ITT)
 1st Veenendaal–Veenendaal
 1st Stage 2 Tour de Luxembourg
 2nd Wincanton Classic
 2nd E3 Harelbeke
 2nd Overall Kellogg's Tour
 3rd Overall Paris–Nice
 4th Overall Ronde van Nederland
 5th Overall Vuelta a Andalucía
 5th Overall Three Days of De Panne
1995
 1st Stage 5 Tour de Suisse
 2nd Overall Ronde van Nederland
1st Stage 3b
 2nd Overall Tour DuPont
1st Stage 11 (ITT)
 4th Paris–Roubaix
 4th Overall Vuelta a Burgos
 7th Overall Volta a la Comunitat Valenciana
 7th Overall Setmana Catalana de Ciclisme
 8th Overall Paris–Nice
 8th Tour of Flanders
1996
 1st  Overall Three Days of De Panne
 4th Tour of Flanders
 4th E3 Harelbeke
 5th Grand Prix des Nations
 5th Grand Prix Eddy Merckx
 6th Overall Vuelta a Murcia
1st Stage 2
 7th Overall Tirreno–Adriatico
 8th Paris–Roubaix
 8th Overall Tour de Luxembourg
 8th Japan Cup Cycle Road Race
 8th Josef Voegeli Memorial
 9th Time trial, UCI Road World Championships
1997
 1st  Road race, National Road Championships
 1st Stage 5 Vuelta a Castilla y León
 2nd Paris–Camembert
 3rd Overall Setmana Catalana de Ciclisme
1st Stage 3
 4th Overall Paris–Nice
1st Stage 7b (ITT)
 4th Overall Ronde van Nederland
 5th Overall Volta a la Comunitat Valenciana
 5th GP du canton d'Argovie
 8th Overall Critérium du Dauphiné Libéré
1st Stages 2 & 4 (ITT)
 9th Overall Tour de Romandie
 10th Tour of Flanders
 10th Overall Vuelta a Andalucía
1998
 1st Stage 6 Prudential Tour
 2nd Overall Ronde van Nederland
 2nd Trofeo Luis Puig
 3rd Grand Prix Eddy Merckx
 5th Overall Four Days of Dunkirk
 7th Tour of Flanders
 7th Overall Vuelta a Andalucía
 7th Scheldeprijs
 9th Time trial, UCI Road World Championships
1999
 1st Stage 15 Vuelta a España
 1st Stage 5 (ITT) Tour de Suisse
 1st Stage 3 Gran Premio Internacional Telecom
 1st Stage 3 Vuelta al Táchira
2000
 1st  Time trial, Olympic Games
 1st  Overall Three Days of De Panne
 1st Grand Prix Eddy Merckx (with Lance Armstrong)
 4th Overall Tour de Pologne
 10th Chrono des Herbiers
2001
 1st Stage 5 (ITT) Volta a la Comunitat Valenciana
 3rd Overall Three Days of De Panne
1st Stage 3b (ITT)
 3rd EnBW Grand Prix (with Víctor Hugo Peña)
 6th Grand Prix Eddy Merckx
 7th Overall Ronde van Nederland
 7th Philadelphia International Cycling Classic
 10th Overall Volta ao Algarve
2002
 4th San Francisco Grand Prix
 5th Grand Prix Eddy Merckx
 6th Grand Prix des Nations
2003
 1st  Overall  Ronde van Nederland
1st Stage 4 (ITT)
 1st Stage 4 (TTT) Tour de France
 3rd Paris–Roubaix
 3rd San Francisco Grand Prix
 5th Overall Three Days of De Panne
 6th Time trial, UCI Road World Championships
 6th Trofeo Laigueglia
 7th Grand Prix Eddy Merckx
 8th Tour of Flanders
2004
 1st  Time trial, Olympic Games
 1st Stage 4 (TTT) Tour de France
 2nd Overall Ronde van Nederland
1st Stage 4 (ITT)
 2nd Overall Tour du Languedoc-Roussillon
 5th Overall Tour de Georgia
 5th Grand Prix Eddy Merckx
2005
 1st Stage 4 (ITT) Three Days of De Panne
2006
 2nd Eindhoven Team Time Trial

Grand Tour general classification results timeline

References

External links

 

1966 births
Living people
Sportspeople from Vyborg
Russian male cyclists
Olympic cyclists of the Soviet Union
Olympic gold medalists for the Soviet Union
Olympic cyclists of Russia
Olympic gold medalists for Russia
Cyclists at the 1988 Summer Olympics
Cyclists at the 2000 Summer Olympics
Cyclists at the 2004 Summer Olympics
Russian Tour de France stage winners
Russian Vuelta a España stage winners
Olympic medalists in cycling
Tour de Suisse stage winners
Katusha–Alpecin
UCI Track Cycling World Champions (men)
Medalists at the 1988 Summer Olympics
Medalists at the 2000 Summer Olympics
Medalists at the 2004 Summer Olympics
Russian track cyclists